A reference is a relationship in which one object designates or links to another.

Reference or reference point may also refer to:
Reference (computer science)
Reference (C++)
Reference (film), a 1985 Bulgarian film
Reference, a citation, i.e., a link to a source of information
Reference, a person or employer who - either verbally or via a written letter of reference or recommendation letter - will attest to one's character or qualifications, e.g., for a board position, job, membership, residency, scholarship, school admission, etc.
Reference design, in engineering
Reference desk, in a library
Reference question, a concept in Canadian public law
Reference work, a dictionary, encyclopedia, etc.
Digital reference (also virtual reference)
Reference.com, an online reference source
Sense and reference (Bedeutung) or Reference, Frege's term for that which an expression designates

See also
Cross-reference
Refer (disambiguation)
Referee (disambiguation)
Referent
Reference point (disambiguation)
Self-reference
Terms of reference

For Wikipedia's reference guideline, see Wikipedia:Citing sources